The Graduates is a 1995 Italian comedy film directed by Leonardo Pieraccioni.

Cast

References

External links 

1995 comedy films
1995 films
Italian comedy films
Films directed by Leonardo Pieraccioni
1990s Italian films